Marcelo Rosa may refer to:

 Marcelo Rosa (footballer, born 1976), Brazilian football midfielder
 Marcelo Rosa (footballer, born 1991), Brazilian football midfielder